Sodium fluorosilicate is a compound with the chemical formula Na2[SiF6].

Natural occurrence
Sodium hexafluorosilicate occurs naturally as the rare mineral malladrite found within some volcanic fumaroles.

Manufacturing
Sodium fluorosilicate is made by neutralizing fluorosilicic acid with sodium chloride or sodium sulfate.

H2[SiF6] + 2 NaCl → Na2[SiF6] + 2 HCl

Possible application 
It is used in some countries as additives for water fluoridation, opal glass raw material, ore refining, or other fluoride chemical (like sodium fluoride, magnesium silicofluoride, cryolite, aluminum fluoride) production.

See also

 Fluorosilicic acid
 Ammonium fluorosilicate

References 

Sodium compounds
Hexafluorosilicates